Eric James Barron (born October 26, 1951) is an American academic administrator who was the 18th president of the Pennsylvania State University from 2014 until 2022. Previously, he was the 14th president of Florida State University and director of the National Center for Atmospheric Research in Boulder, Colorado.

Early life and education
Barron was born on October 26, 1951, in Lafayette, Indiana. He graduated with a Bachelor of Science in geology from Florida State University in 1972 and a Master of Science in oceanography 1976 and a Ph.D. in 1980, both from the University of Miami.

Career
From 1980 to 1985, Barron was employed by the National Center for Atmospheric Research (NCAR) in Boulder, Colorado, as a post-doctoral research fellow and scientist. He subsequently was an associate professor at the University of Miami from 1985 to 1986. Beginning in 1986, Barron was a faculty member at the Pennsylvania State University in the College of Earth and Mineral Sciences, becoming the dean until leaving Penn State in 2006, to become dean of the Jackson School of Geosciences at the University of Texas at Austin. There, he held the Jackson chair in earth system science. In 2008, Barron left the University of Texas to become director of the National Center for Atmospheric Sciences (NCAR) from 2008 to 2010, until being named president of Florida State University in December 2009.

Barron was the 14th president of FSU from February 1, 2010, until stepping down on April 2, 2014, after being named the president-elect of the Pennsylvania State University in February 2014. Following the departure of Rodney Erickson on May 12, 2014, Barron became the 18th president of Penn State. During his term as Penn State's president, he resided in Schreyer House, the official president's residence of the university. In February 2021, Barron indicated to the Penn State Board of Trustees his intent to retire at the end of his contract, in June 2022. Barron's tenure ended in May 2022, when he was succeeded by Neeli Bendapudi. During his presidency, one of Barron's focuses was attempting to transform the Greek life system at Penn State following the death of Tim Piazza.

Barron is a fellow of the American Association for the Advancement of Science and has been chair of numerous National Science Foundation, NASA and United States National Research Council (NRC) committees and panels, including the NRC climate research committee, the NRC board on atmospheric sciences and climate and NASA's earth observing system science executive committee.

References

External links
Eric Barron interviewed on Conversations from Penn State, YouTube

1951 births
Living people
Florida State University alumni
Rosenstiel School of Marine and Atmospheric Science alumni
University of Texas faculty
Florida State University faculty
Presidents of Florida State University
People from Lafayette, Indiana
Pennsylvania State University faculty
Presidents of Pennsylvania State University